The , officially the , was a Taiwanese baseball team established in 1928 in Japanese Formosa. The team was a motley crew that consisted of Han Chinese (Hoklo and Hakka), Taiwanese indigenous people, and Japanese players. The high school baseball team in Kagi (modern-day Chiayi) qualified to represent the island at Koshien, Japan’s long-running nationwide high school baseball tournament, in 1931. Performing beyond all expectations, the underdog team miraculously went on to the championship game before finally losing to a powerful Japanese squad. The Kano side claimed second place in Japan's celebrated national high school tournament, Koshien, where a total of 631 high schools teams from throughout Japan’s empire competed.

The amazing success of a team from a colonized land making to the finals was totally unexpected, and it ultimately earned the Taiwanese baseball players greater respect from their Japanese counterparts. 
The Kano experience also encouraged more people in Taiwan to play baseball, eventually making it the "national sport" in Taiwan.

Kano, a Taiwanese film depicting the baseball team, was released on February 27, 2014.

External links 
Taiwan Culture Portal: Champions of all under heaven:” the Tri-ethnic Kano Baseball Team
Taiwan Culture Portal: Taiwan’s First Sport in its Second Century: Baseball in Taiwanese Culture
Movie over Field of Dreams, Here Comes Taiwan's Magical and Heroic Baseball Movie

Defunct baseball teams in Taiwan